SS Washington was a 24,189-ton luxury liner of the United States Lines, named after the US capital city. On 6 June 1941, the Washington was commissioned as the troopship USS Mount Vernon. In 1947 one deck was restored to prewar condition and the ship resumed commercial service. In 1951 the ship was again used by the U.S. Government transporting soldiers and their families. The ship was laid up in 1953 and scrapped in 1965.

Construction

The Washington was ordered by Transatlantic Steamship Company and laid down on 20 January 1931 in Shipway O at New York Shipbuilding in Camden, New Jersey. By the time the vessel was launched on 20 August 1932, Transatlantic Steamship's assets had been acquired by International Mercantile Marine, and the Washington went into service for the United States Lines following delivery on 2 May 1933.

At the time of their construction, Washington and her sister ship , also built by New York Shipbuilding, were the largest liners ever built in the United States, a status they held until the 1939 launch of SS America. Washington and Manhattan were two of the few pure ocean liners built by New York Shipbuilding, which had previously built a large number of cargo liners. Accommodations were 580 in Cabin class, 400 in Tourist, and 150 Third class. Both ships were to garner a reputation for a very high standard of service and luxury.

United States Lines signed contracts in 1931 for the Manhattan and Washington for approximately $21 million each.

Commercial career

Washington joined her sister ship Manhattan on the New York-Hamburg route, a route she continued to serve with only one short break until December 1939, when Roosevelt invoked the 1939 Neutrality Act against Germany. Both ships then moved to the New York-Naples-Genoa run until June 1940, when the Battle of France was raging. Its last voyage from Europe to America, made specifically to repatriate US citizens, departed from Genoa, Lisbon, Le Verdon-sur-Mer (near Bordeaux, France, 8 June) and Galway (12 June), encountered a German U-boat off the coast of Portugal on the morning of 11 June and arrived in New York on 21 June. Austrian jurist Hans Kelsen and his family embarked Washington in Lisbon on 1 June. With the increasing danger from German submarines, Washington and Manhattan were shifted to the New York-San Francisco service via the Panama Canal.

Military career

On 6 June 1941, Washington was requisitioned and leased by the US Navy, and was subsequently commissioned as the troopship USS Mount Vernon. The conversion was performed by the Philadelphia Navy Yard. In Navy service, Mount Vernon frequently sailed in company with the other United States Lines fast liners SS Manhattan (USS Wakefield) and SS America (USS West Point), most notably on a secret assignment carrying British troops to Singapore—a convoy mission which began a month before Pearl Harbor.

In January 1946, Mount Vernon was decommissioned and returned to the U.S. Maritime Commission, regaining the name Washington at that time. Her luxurious appointments had been carefully removed and stored, and she returned to commercial service in February 1947. Only one deck was restored to its pre-war standards, however, and the ship provided accommodations for 1106 passengers in a single class. United States Lines returned her to the U.S. government in October 1951, and the final phase of her career found her transporting soldiers and their families between New York and Bremerhaven. Laid up in reserve in the Hudson River in 1953, she was ultimately scrapped at Kearny, New Jersey in 1965.

References

Sources 
 Gibbs, C.R. Vernon (1957). Passenger Liners of the Western Ocean (2nd ed). London: Staples Press Limited. LCCN 57001880
 
 New York Shipbuilding Corporation (1948). 50 Years: New York Shipbuilding Corporation. Camden:house publication
 Newell, Gordon (1963). Ocean Liners of the 20th Century (1st ed.). Seattle: Superior Publishing Company. LCCN 63-18494

External links
Shipping Wonders of the World (1937) of chapter on The Manhattan and the Washington (pages=678-682) is illustrated description of these ships.

Ocean liners
1932 ships
Ships of the United States Lines
Ships built by New York Shipbuilding Corporation